The 1991 Blockbuster Bowl, part of the 1991 bowl game season, took place on December 28, 1991, at Joe Robbie Stadium in Miami Gardens, Florida. The competing teams were the Alabama Crimson Tide, representing the Southeastern Conference (SEC), and the Colorado Buffaloes, representing the Big Eight Conference (Big 8). Alabama won the game 30–25.

Game summary

Scoring

References

Blockbuster Bowl
Cheez-It Bowl
Alabama Crimson Tide football bowl games
Colorado Buffaloes football bowl games
Blockbuster Bowl
Blockbuster Bowl
Sports competitions in Miami Gardens, Florida